John Baptist Wu Cheng-chung (26 March 1925 – 23 September 2002) was the fifth Roman Catholic bishop of Hong Kong and the first cardinal from that diocese. He was a member of the Congregation for the Evangelization of Peoples, the Pontifical Council for Social Communications and the Congregation for Divine Worship and the Discipline of the Sacraments.

Biography
A Hakka, Wu was born in the village of Ho Hau, Wu-hua (Province of Guangdong, Diocese of Kai-ying). Baptized in the village's parish church, he received his primary education there. He joined the diocesan minor seminary of Ka-ying for his secondary education in 1940 and was ordained in 1952.

He was appointed the fifth Bishop of the Hong Kong Catholic Diocese by Pope Paul VI as successor to Bishop Peter Lei Wang-kei who had died on 23 July 1974. He arrived in Hong Kong and on 25 July was consecrated and installed as Bishop of the Hong Kong in the Cathedral of the Immaculate Conception in 1975.

After due preparation, he initiated a Diocesan Renewal Movement for priests, laity and religious. On 25 March 1985, he led a five-member delegation on a seven-day visit to Beijing and Shanghai, at the invitation of the National Bureau of Religious Affairs under the State Council of China. He was the first bishop of Hong Kong to visit the mainland China. Later on 21 January 1986, he led a seven-member delegation on a ten-day visit to Guangzhou and the eastern part of his home Province, Guangdong, at the invitation of the Bureau of Religious Affairs of that Province. This visit marked the first reunion with his 85-year-old mother, after a separation of 40 years.

He was named a member of the Sacred College of Cardinals by Pope John Paul II on 29 May 1988.

After the Tiananmen Square protests of 1989, on 11 July 1989, he wrote a letter to all the bishops in the world, requesting them to appeal for justice, order and democracy in China.

On 1 September 1991, Wu issued a pastoral letter that exhorting the faithful to give full support to the direct elections to the Legislative Council – the first time in the history of Hong Kong – on 15 September. In 1999, he convoked the "Diocesan Synod" to meet the pastoral needs of the Third Millennium.

He died of cancer and diabetes on 23 September 2002 at Queen Mary Hospital in Hong Kong, aged 77.

See also
Roman Catholic Diocese of Hong Kong

References

External links

GCatholic.org on the Bishops of Hong Kong
 Notice of death of Cardinal Wu

Roman Catholic bishops of Hong Kong
20th-century Roman Catholic bishops in Hong Kong
21st-century Roman Catholic bishops in Hong Kong
Chinese cardinals
1925 births
2002 deaths
Hong Kong people of Hakka descent
People from Wuhua
Cardinals created by Pope John Paul II
Deaths from cancer in Hong Kong
Deaths from diabetes
Chinese emigrants to British Hong Kong